Ouray National Forest was established by the U.S. Forest Service in Colorado on February 22, 1907, with . On July 1, 1908, the entire forest was divided between Montezuma National Forest and Uncompahgre National Forest and the name was discontinued.

References

External links
Forest History Society
Listing of the National Forests of the United States and Their Dates (from the Forest History Society website) Text from Davis, Richard C., ed. Encyclopedia of American Forest and Conservation History. New York: Macmillan Publishing Company for the Forest History Society, 1983. Vol. II, pp. 743-788.

Former National Forests of Colorado